T. celebensis may refer to:

Taeromys celebensis, the Celebes rat, a rodent species
Telmatherina celebensis, a fish species
Tyspanodes celebensis, a moth species